Shyshkivtsi, a village in Ukraine, is located within Chortkiv Raion of Ternopil Oblast. It belongs to Borshchiv urban hromada, one of the hromadas of Ukraine.

References

Notes

Sources 
 

Villages in Chortkiv Raion